The Avenger of Venice is a 1964 adventure film written and directed  by Pierro Pierotti and Carlo Campogalliani and starring Brett Halsey and Gianna Maria Canale. It is based on a novel by Michel Zevaco.

Cast 
Brett Halsey as Rolando Candiano
Gianna Maria Canale as  Imperia
 Burt Nelson as Scalabrino
Conrado San Martín as Captain Altieri
Vira Silenti as  Leonora
José Marco Davó as  Bembo Altieri
José Nieto as Dandolo
Perla Cristal as  Juana
Jean Murat as  Candiano
 Paolo Gozlino as  Captain Lorenzi
 Nino Persello 
Andrea Bosic
Nello Pazzafini

Release
The Avenger of Venice was released on 16 March 1964.

See also
 Sul ponte dei sospiri (1953)

References

Bibliography

External links

 

Italian adventure films
1964 adventure films
1964 films
Films directed by Carlo Campogalliani
Films directed by Piero Pierotti
Films set in Venice
Remakes of Italian films
Films about bridges
1960s Italian films